The Visconti Rocca of Castell'Arquato is a Rocca in the mediaeval town of Castell'Arquato, Emilia Romagna, Northern Italy. It was erected on the site of a previous fortification by Luchino Visconti in the 14th century after his family acquired Castell'Arquato.

History
A fortress probably existed in Castell'Arquato already in the 8th century as a belonging of the bishop of Piacenza. In the following centuries, its owner changed several times. It belonged to the imperial authority, the local Commune, and the Piacenza Commune. At the beginning of the 14th century, it was under the lordship of Alberto Scoto. In 1316 Galeazzo I Visconti took control of Piacenza's territory, and therefore also of Castell'Arquato. He lost Piacenza in 1322, when, after the uprising promoted by Obizzo Landi and supported by the Church, Castell'Arquato was handed over again to the Piacenza Commune.

Later, the Visconti returned to Castell'Arquato with Azzone, who built the town walls. One of its doors towards the valley (the 'Porta di Sasso') still exists today. The Rocca was probably initiated in 1342 and completed in 1347 by Luchino Visconti.

Description
The Rocca has an L-shape, a plan unique in the Piacenza area. It consists of two separated parts. A rectangular enclosure is arranged on the lower level of the steeply sloping ground. A smaller section, also rectangular but higher is placed perpendicular to the first.

The two enclosures have quadrangular towers at each corner, oriented along the four cardinal points. The keep faces the Castell'Arquato civic square, surrounded on two different sides by the apses of the romanesque collegiate and the Palazzo del Podestà.

References

Sources

External links
 Il portale di Castell'Arquato, città d'arte – La Rocca di Castell'Arquato
 I Castelli del Ducato di Parma, Piacenza e Pontremoli – Rocca Viscontea di Castell'Arquato

Castles in Emilia-Romagna